The enchanted side-blotched lizard or San Lorenzo Island lizard (Uta encantadae) is a species of lizard. Its range is in Mexico.

References 

Uta
Reptiles of Mexico
Reptiles described in 1994
Taxa named by Larry Lee Grismer